Miracle in the Rain is a United States home front during World War II-themed novella by veteran screenwriter Ben Hecht, published in the April 3, 1943 issue of The Saturday Evening Post weekly magazine then, within six months, issued in booklet form and, thirteen years later, following four live television productions (in 1947, 1949, 1950 and 1953) which reduced the story to plot essentials, was adapted by him into a Warner Bros. feature film released on March 31, 1956.

Film version
Hecht's 1956 screenplay is directed by Rudolph Maté and stars Jane Wyman as a lonely New York City office worker and Van Johnson as the happy-go-lucky soldier whom she meets during a downpour. Character actress Eileen Heckart, who plays Jane Wyman's office friend, and Arte Johnson, who achieved TV fame twelve years later on Laugh-In, are seen here in their debut performances on the big screen. The music is by Franz Waxman and the black-and-white cinematography is by Russell Metty.  A subplot about the heroine's estranged father, which was neither in the original story nor in any of the television adaptations, became one of the elements in the embellished screenplay.

The film was produced on location, with several sequences filmed in Central Park and St. Patrick's Cathedral. Ten months before its release, while appearing as the "Mystery Guest" on the May 22, 1955 episode of CBS' live primetime weekly game show, What's My Line?, Van Johnson mentioned that he was in New York shooting scenes for his new film, Miracle in the Rain.

The film earned an estimated $1.4 million in theatrical rentals in the United States and Canada during 1956.

Opening narration
"Champion of all the cities of the Earth is the towering golden city of New York. It looms higher than any town of man before. Within its giant walls, its steel sinews, are more enterprises, more people, more mystery and more music than were ever known before. Its windows are like the leaves of a mighty forest and its streets are filled with wonder. Our story begins on a spring morning in May 1942 as the people of this remarkable city start to live and work another day."

Plot
A few months after America's entry into World War II, secretary Ruth Wood (Jane Wyman) lives quietly in Manhattan with her physically and emotionally fragile mother, Agnes (Josephine Hutchinson). Ruth's co-workers at Excelsior Shoe Manufacturing Company are her best friend Grace Ullman (Eileen Heckart) and Millie Kranz (Peggie Castle), an attractive blonde involved in an affair with her married boss, Stephen Jalonik (Fred Clark). Also in the office is Monty (Arte Johnson), a young shipping clerk classified by the draft as 4-F, who monitors the war's campaigns on a world map pinned to the wall.

One evening after work, when a cloudburst forces Ruth and other pedestrians to take shelter in the vestibule of an office building, Arthur Hugenon (Van Johnson), a cheerful, talkative G.I. stationed in the area, surprises the shy Ruth by starting a conversation. When he invites her to dinner, she declines, saying that her housebound mother is expecting her. Undeterred, Art buys food for three at a delicatessen and accompanies Ruth home. Agnes, who has distrusted men since her husband Harry left her for another woman ten years earlier, receives Art with little enthusiasm. During the meal, Art, who grew up on a Tennessee farm, captivates Ruth with his stories and afterward entertains them by playing Harry's piano. Upon finding the manuscript of an unfinished melody Harry composed, Art asks permission to take it back to camp, where he and his army buddy Dixie will write lyrics for it. When weekend arrives, Art takes Ruth and Grace to a matinee and, as they afterwards walk to a restaurant, passing an auction, Ruth impulsively bids on an antique Roman coin, which she gives to Art for good luck. While the trio is enjoying dinner at the Café Normandy, Ruth is unaware that the piano player is her father (William Gargan), whom she has not seen since he left Agnes. However, Harry recognizes Ruth and confides to his bartender friend Andy that he has been too ashamed to return to his family.

Later, Ruth tells Art that Agnes tried to kill herself after Harry left and still hopes for his return. Art arrives late for their next Sunday date, but brings the lyrics he and Dixie have written to Harry's music, entitled "I'll Always Believe in You", which he sings together with Ruth. As they go out and walk through Central Park, Ruth voices fears about the war and Art tells her she must have faith. They then encounter Sergeant Gil Parker (Alan King), while he takes snapshots of his new bride, Arlene Witchy (Barbara Nichols), who works as a singer. Gil asks Art to take their picture and then offers to photograph Art and Ruth. In private, Gil warns Art that his division will soon be shipped overseas, but Art refuses to believe the rumor. At the lagoon, where children are sailing toy boats, Art recognizes the name of an elderly man, Commodore Eli B. Windgate (Halliwell Hobbes), nicknamed "Windy", a former yachtsman who owned many of the surrounding buildings before losing his fortune in the Crash of '29. Hoping to be a reporter after the war, Art senses a good story and interviews Windy on the spot. He then goes with Ruth to The New York Times Building and convinces the city editor (unbilled Grandon Rhodes) to let him write it as a human interest story. Instead of taking payment, Art asks to be considered for a reporting job after the war. A couple of days later, as Ruth waits to meet him for their pre-arranged date, Art arrives late, riding on a truck filled with other soldiers, including Dixie (unbilled Paul Smith). With only a brief moment remaining before the truck's departure for the port where the troop ship awaits, he asks Ruth to marry him when he returns and, to allay her fears, says he still has the lucky Roman coin.

For three months, Ruth writes to Art every day, but receives no letters in return. Finally, a special delivery man knocks on the apartment door and hands a letter from a battlefield chaplain informing her that Art died in combat and that his dying wish was that she be told about his love for her. Ruth's tear drops on the letter and, in the following days and weeks, she is inconsolable despite the best efforts of her friends and co-workers. Millie, moved by Ruth's misfortune, feels the need for a fresh and pure start, drops Jalonik as her lover and leaves the firm. Grace finds Ruth consumed by grief, sitting on a bench in Central Park, and takes her to St. Patrick's Cathedral, where Ruth lights candles under the statue of Saint Andrew. Jalonik, hoping Ruth will fill the void left in his extra-marital life by Millie, takes her to Café Normandy and attempts to engage in a warm-up conversation, but Ruth is in such a despairing state that she pays no attention as he kisses her on the cheek. A few feet to the side, at the bar, Harry has the radio on and hears the familiar strains of his music since, before shipping out, Dixie made suggestions to Art as to the possibility of marketing Harry's music with Art's lyrics as a professional song. Puzzled, Harry dials Agnes' number but, at the sound of her voice, his resolve falters and he hangs up without speaking. Having written numerous letters of explanation and contrition to Agnes, he continually found himself tearing them to bits, because of inability to face the hurt he caused her.

Ruth has been returning to the statue of St. Andrew and talking to the cathedral's young priest (Paul Picerni). Losing interest in life, she ignores a cold, which turns into pneumonia. Mrs. Hamer, the upstairs neighbor who has often helped Ruth care for Agnes, now helps Agnes nurse the bedridden Ruth. One rainy night, while Agnes has dozed off near her bedside, the feverish Ruth leaves the apartment just before Harry finally musters the courage to walk in with the intention of asking Agnes' forgiveness for leaving. Stunned at seeing him, Agnes also realizes that Ruth is missing, just as Grace telephones. Upon being told that Ruth has left her sickbed, Grace realizes that she must be heading for the cathedral.

Standing on the cathedral steps, consumed by fever, Ruth hears Art's voice speaking her name. Delirious, she sees Art materialize and slowly approach close enough for an embrace or a kiss as he tells her that love never dies. No longer possessing earthly means of holding on to the Roman coin she gifted to him, Art returns it to Ruth. A moment later, in the midst of the heavy, late evening rain, the priest finds Ruth unconscious on the steps, just as Grace arrives. Seeing the coin clasped in Ruth's hand, he shows it to Grace, who recognizes it and realizes that, for a brief moment, Art had returned to Ruth, whose own tenuous hold on life remains clouded in uncertainty at the final fadeout.

Closing narration
"Thus, a story of New York — and of an antique Roman coin. That's the way we heard it. We'd like to believe it's true."

Cast

  
Jane Wyman as  Ruth Wood
Van Johnson as Arthur "Art" Hugenon
Peggie Castle as Millie Kranz, blonde secretary at Ruth's workplace
Fred Clark as Stephen Jalonik, office manager at Ruth's workplace
Eileen Heckart as Grace Ullman, Ruth's workplace friend
Josephine Hutchinson as Agnes Wood, Ruth's mother
William Gargan as Harry Wood, Ruth's father

Marcel Dalio as Marcel, waiter at Café Normandy
George Givot as Maitre d' at Café Normandy
Barbara Nichols as Arlene Witchy, exotic dancer newly married to Sergeant Gilbert Parker
Halliwell Hobbes as Ely B. "Windy" Windgate ("Wingate" in The New York Times headline of Art's story, but "Windgate" within the body of the article), former millionaire
Paul Picerni as Priest at St. Patrick's Cathedral
Alan King as Sergeant Gilbert "Gil" Parker
Irene Seidner as Mrs. Hamer, Ruth's elderly neighbor
Arte Johnson as Monty, office boy at Ruth's workplace

Unbilled speaking roles (in order of appearance)
Walter Kingson [Unseen narrator: "Champion of all the cities of the Earth is the towering, golden city of New York."]
Marian Holmes [Mrs. Sara Rickles, receptionist at Ruth's workplace: "Your wife called two minutes ago."]
Ray Walker [Mr. McGuire, salesman at Ruth's workplace: "Hiya, slaves. I'm tackling Poughkeepsie today."]
Minerva Urecal [Delicatessen proprietress: "A corned beef, fresh. Eh, you like some baloney?  It's a good."]
Frank J. Scannell [Auctioneer: "Seventy seven, the luckiest number in the world.  Now we have something special — a genuine Roman coin."]
Peter Mamakos [Headwaiter at Café Normandy: "We don't take reservations on Saturday night.  You know that."]
Jess Kirkpatrick [Andy, bartender at Café Normandy: "Whatsa matter, Harry?  You got a little pale."]
Norbert Schiller [Doctor Zero, eccentric character seen pacing in outer office of The New York Times city editor: "Phfft, phfft."]
Charles Meredith [The New York Times representative: "Doctor Zero? Our city editor asked me to tell you that The New York Times has no interest in stories about the end of the world."]
Grandon Rhodes [Mr. Baldwin, The New York Times city editor: "I hear you ran into a story in the park.  Rowboat turn over?"]
Harry Harvey, Jr. [The New York Times office boy: "It's right in the second drawer."]
Paul Smith [Dixie Dooley, Art's Army buddy: "We can't stay more than three minutes, Art."]
Michael Vallon [Flower vendor passing in a horse-drawn wagon: "Fresh flowers, nice fresh flowers."]
Glen Vernon [Emcee at The Garden of Bali, 52nd Street: "Come on, come on, let's bring the little lady back, no extra charge.  Here she is, Arlene Witchy."]
Malcolm Atterbury [Special Delivery man with letter from the battlefield: "Miss Ruth Wood?  Special Delivery for you."]
Roxanne Arlen [Attractive new secretary who has been hired to replace Millie Kranz: "Yes, Miss Ullman."]

Song
"I'll Always Believe in You", music by Ray Heindorf and M. K. Jerome, lyric by Ned Washington is used within the plot to represent the melody by Ruth's father, to which Art adds words and turns into a song.

Evaluation in film guides
Leonard Maltin's Movie Guide (2011 edition) gave Miracle in the Rain 2½ stars (out of 4), describing it as an "above-par soaper of two lost souls" and Steven H. Scheuer's Movies on TV (1986–87 edition) also granted 2½ stars (out of 4), calling it a "sentimental women's picture" and evaluating that "the two stars do well and there's a good supporting performance by Eileen Heckart, as Jane's friend".

Assigning 2 stars (out of 5), The Motion Picture Guide (1987 edition) opined that "Ben Hecht was usually a lot more cynical than what he showed in his novel and screenplay for this hankie-grabber". Evaluating that the presentation has "a bit of comedy from comic King and Nichols, as a stripper, but it's otherwise heavy going", the write-up decides that "too many secondary stories and not enough on-screen time between Wyman and a living, breathing Johnson, are what detract from the picture".

Among British references, veteran critic and TimeOut Film Guide founding editor Tom Milne characterized it as a "weepie" and found it "not a patch on Minnelli's The Clock, though much better than one might expect, thanks to a similar concern for humble detail and a nice array of New York locations", but concluded that "the final 'miracle' — one of scriptwriter Ben Hecht's follies", to be "a tough lump of goo to swallow" (from 2009 edition). Leslie Halliwell in his Film Guide (5th edition, 1986) offered similar views, granting it 2 stars (out of 4) and describing it as "archetypal Hollywood schmaltz, half acute observation of amusing types, half sentimental whimsy, with a final supernatural touch of eating your cake and having it". The write-up also included the film's tagline: "A street corner pick-up that worked a miracle of love! A picture of very special greatness!". Finally, David Shipman in his 1984 Good Film and Video Guide, also settles on 2 stars (out of 4), positing that "Ben Hecht's screenplay is of the genre 'spiritual', and may have been undertaken cynically, but the director has set it in a realistic, working-class New York then rarely seen in movies, so it acquires a certain patina. And it is very nicely played, by Jane Wyman… and Alan King, as a soldier enamoured of his new wife (Barbara Nichols), an untalented cabaret artist."

Television productions

NBC Television Theater (1947)
During the late 1940s and early 1950s, at the start of a period in American TV which was subsequently characterized as the Golden Age of Television or, more precisely, "Golden Age of Live TV Drama", four anthology drama showcases used varying time formats to broadcast adaptations of Miracle in the Rain. The first of these aired during NBC's 1946–47 season, an early period of irregular programming, nearly two years before the start of network TV's first full-schedule season in October 1948. Beginning in January 1946, NBC had been presenting on Sunday evenings, between 8:30 and 9:30 or between 9 and 10, a series of live dramas under the umbrella title of Broadway Previews (later changed to NBC Television Theater).

On Sunday, February 23, 1947, from 9:05 to 9:50, presentation records indicate a sponsored (by Borden) production of Ben Hecht's Miracle in the Rain, adapted by NBC's resident director and head of the network's drama division, Fred Coe. The records are missing details regarding members of the cast or whether Coe also directed the episode.

Chevrolet on Broadway (1949)
The second presentation of the story aired as the February 14, 1949 episode of NBC's 30-minute weekly live drama series, Chevrolet Tele-Theater which, during its earliest months, was titled Chevrolet on Broadway. Presented on a high budget by the automaker, the show's productions tended to use established Hollywood talent which was more expensive than lesser-known actors from the New York stage. Reducing the plot to its core elements, the twenty-six-minute Valentine's Day encapsulation of the original novella starred, as Ruth, Mary Anderson who, in the previous five years, had played the female lead or second lead in six major studio films, including 1944's Lifeboat and Wilson, 1946's To Each His Own and 1947's Whispering City.

Art was portrayed, in his TV debut, by John Dall who, a few months earlier, in 1948, had co-starred as one of the two Leopold and Loeb-like thrill killers in Alfred Hitchcock's first Technicolor film, Rope and, two years before that, at the 18th Academy Awards, was one of the nominees for Best Supporting Actor as a result of his first film role, playing a young Welsh coal miner given a chance for a better life in 1945's The Corn Is Green. The episode was produced by former actor Owen Davis, Jr. (who drowned in a boating accident three months later, on May 21), directed by Gordon Duff and adapted by The Corn Is Green playwright Emlyn Williams. NBC's records indicate that despite the brevity of the adaptation, the storyline included three other cast members, Viola Frayne, Lee Harris and Jesse White, but the identities of their characters were not specified.

Studio One (1950)
The following year, Westinghouse Studio One, which started, in 1948, as CBS' first regularly-scheduled weekly anthology drama series and, unlike Chevrolet Tele-Theater, had an hour-long time slot, presented its adaptation (by David Shaw) on May 1, 1950. Directed by Franklin Schaffner, whose helming of Patton, twenty years later, would win him an Academy Award for Best Director, the live production starred Jeffrey Lynn as Art Hugenon. In the three years between his film debut in 1938 and the start of his World War II service in 1941, Lynn played leads and second leads in eighteen films and was touted by his studio, Warner Bros., as a potential top star of the future. However, upon returning to the screen after a seven-year absence, he found that his initial six films in the 1948–50 period, including the acclaimed A Letter to Three Wives, did not restore his career as leading man and he turned to television, making his small-screen debut with Miracle in the Rain.

The role of Ruth Wood was given to Joy Geffen, a New York stage actress with a number of undocumented appearances during TV's earliest days and at least six confirmed roles in live dramas airing between 1949 and 1953. The on-screen credits also list Catherine Squire as Mrs. Wood and Eleanor Wilson as Flora Ullman, a name that deviated from the 1956 film's "Grace Ullman". Announcer Paul Brinson states that "others in the cast of 'Miracle in the Rain' were Howard Caine [auctioneer selling the Roman coin], Cyrus Steele [restaurant maitre d'], Julian Noa [doctor attending to Ruth] and Carl Dodd".

Tales of the City (1953)
Just over three years later, on August 20, 1953, another production of the story, once again pared down to a half-hour, was presented by a live drama showcase based on the stories of the novella's original author. A seven-episode CBS summer series, referenced as Tales of the City, but bearing the official title, Willys Theatre Presenting Ben Hecht's Tales of the City, used Hecht as the unseen narrator, setting the scenes at the opening of his stories, filling in gaps, and offering closing comments. Miracle in the Rain, the fifth episode, adapted, as were all the others, by Hecht, and directed by Robert Stevens, starred, as Art and Ruth, two familiar TV faces, William Prince and Phyllis Thaxter.

Prince, who served in World War II, and briefly appeared as a serviceman in one of 1944's highest-grossing films, the wartime morale booster Hollywood Canteen, played second and third leads in seven additional films made between 1943 and 1950, with the last of these giving him the third-billed role of Cyrano's friend Christian de Neuvillette in José Ferrer's Oscar-winning portrayal of Cyrano de Bergerac, and then devoted his career primarily to television and theater. Likewise, Phyllis Thaxter, at the start of a long TV career, after playing a couple of minor leads and several second and third leads in seventeen films produced between 1944 and 1952, made her first small-screen appearance in this twenty-six-minute miniaturization of Miracle in the Rain, which also included Una Merkel as Ruth's mother and Mildred Dunnock as Grace.

References

External links
 
 
 
 
 Miracle in the Rain at TV Guide (1987 slightly revised write-up was originally published in The Motion Picture Guide)
 Miracle in the Rain at DVD Verdict
 
 Miracle in the Rain at Cinema Crazed 
 Miracle in the Rain at Ozus' World Movie Reviews
 
 Miracle in the Rain at The Science Fiction, Horror and Fantasy Film Review
 Miracle in the Rain {along with 1945's The Clock, 1988's Crossing Delancey and 1959's A Summer Place} at Reel Film Reviews
 screen captures from Miracle in the Rain at DVD Beaver

1943 American novels
Fiction set in 1942
American novellas
Novels set in New York City
Works originally published in The Saturday Evening Post
1956 films
1950s romantic fantasy films
1956 romantic drama films
American romantic drama films
American romantic fantasy films
American black-and-white films
Films scored by Franz Waxman
Films about religion
Films based on American novels
Films directed by Rudolph Maté
Films set in 1942
Films set in New York City
Films set on the home front during World War II
Films with screenplays by Ben Hecht
Warner Bros. films
Alfred A. Knopf books
American novels adapted into films
1950s English-language films
1950s American films